The Chamberlin Glacier is located in the far northwest of Greenland, to the north of the Thule Air Base. It is one of four large glaciers which feeds the Wolstenholme Fjord. The other glaciers are the Salisbury Glacier, the Knud Rasmussen Glacier, and the Harald Moltke Glacier.

See also 
List of glaciers in Greenland

Further reading 
 Steven J. Mock, Fluctuations of the terminus of the Moltke Glacier, Cold Regions Research and Engineering Laboratory (U.S.), P 2
 Greenland Ecosystem Monitoring, ANNUAL REPORT CARDS 2018

References 

Glaciers of Greenland